The 2008 Open Championship was a men's major golf championship and the 137th Open Championship, played from 17 to 20 July at Royal Birkdale Golf Club in Southport, England. Pádraig Harrington successfully defended his Open Championship title, his second; he shot four under par over the final nine holes and was four strokes ahead of runner-up Ian Poulter. Harrington was the last golfer to win the same major back-to-back for a decade until Brooks Koepka won consecutive U.S. Opens in 2017 and 2018.

Television coverage was provided as usual by the BBC in the UK, and by ABC and TNT in the United States.

Field
World Number One Tiger Woods was the most notable absentee, as he was recovering from knee surgery following his victory at the U.S. Open.

About two-thirds of the field each year consists of players that are fully exempt from qualifying for the Open. Below is the list of the exemption categories and the players who are exempt. Each player is classified according to the first category by which he qualified, but other categories are shown in parentheses. Some categories are not shown as all players in that category had already qualified from an earlier category:

1. First 10 and anyone tying for 10th place in the 2007 Open Championship
K. J. Choi (7,15,19), Stewart Cink (7,19), Ben Curtis (3,4), Ernie Els (3,4,5,7,15,19), Sergio García (5,7,14,15), Richard Green, Pádraig Harrington (3,4,5,7), Hunter Mahan (7,15,19), Andrés Romero (5,7), Steve Stricker (7,15,19), Mike Weir (7,19)

2. Past Open Champions born between 20 July 1942 and 19 July 1948
(Eligible but not competing: Tony Jacklin, Johnny Miller, Tom Weiskopf)

3. Past Open Champions aged 60 or under on 20 July 2008
Mark Calcavecchia (15), John Daly, David Duval (4), Todd Hamilton (4), Paul Lawrie (4), Tom Lehman, Justin Leonard (7), Sandy Lyle, Greg Norman, Mark O'Meara (4), Tom Watson (28)
(Eligible but not competing: Ian Baker-Finch, Seve Ballesteros, Nick Faldo, Nick Price, Bill Rogers, Tiger Woods)

4. The Open Champions for 1998-2007

5. First 20 in the PGA European Tour Final Order of Merit for 2007
Ángel Cabrera (7,11,19), Paul Casey (7), Nick Dougherty, Niclas Fasth (7), Retief Goosen (7,11,19), Anders Hansen (6), Søren Hansen (7), Peter Hanson, Grégory Havret, Søren Kjeldsen, Colin Montgomerie, Justin Rose (7,15), Henrik Stenson (7), Richard Sterne (7), Graeme Storm, Lee Westwood (7)

6. The BMW PGA Championship winners for 2006-2008
David Howell, Miguel Ángel Jiménez (7)

7. The first 50 players on the Official World Golf Rankings for Week 21, 2008
Robert Allenby, Stephen Ames (14), Stuart Appleby (19), Woody Austin (15,19), Aaron Baddeley (15), Tim Clark, Jim Furyk (15,19,23), J. B. Holmes, Trevor Immelman (12,19), Zach Johnson (12,15,19), Robert Karlsson, Martin Kaymer, Anthony Kim, Phil Mickelson (12,13,14,15,19), Geoff Ogilvy (11,15,19), Sean O'Hair, Rod Pampling, Ian Poulter, Jeff Quinney, Rory Sabbatini (15,19), Adam Scott (15,19), Vijay Singh (13,15,19), Brandt Snedeker (15), Scott Verplank (15,19), Boo Weekley, Oliver Wilson
(Eligible but not competing: Shingo Katayama, Luke Donald withdrew prior to start of tournament with a wrist injury, Toru Taniguchi withdrew prior to start of tournament with a back injury)

8. First 3 and anyone tying for 3rd place, not exempt having applied above, in the top 20 of the 2008 PGA European Tour Order of Merit on completion of the 2008 BMW PGA Championship
Richard Finch, Graeme McDowell, Damien McGrane

9. First 2 European Tour members and any European Tour members tying for 2nd place, not exempt, in a cumulative money list taken from all official PGA European Tour events from OWGR Week 19 up to and including the Open de France and including the U.S. Open
Pablo Larrazábal, Scott Strange

10. The leading player, not exempt having applied above, in the first 5 and ties of each of the 2008 European Open and the 2008 Barclays Scottish Open.
David Frost, Simon Khan

11. The U.S. Open Champions for 2004-2008
Michael Campbell

12. The U.S. Masters Champions for 2004-2008

13. The U.S. PGA Champions for 2003-2007
(Eligible but not competing: Shaun Micheel)

14. The U.S. PGA Tour Players Champions for 2006-2008

15. Top 20 on the Official Money List of the 2007 PGA Tour
Charles Howell III (19)

16. First 3 and anyone tying for 3rd place, not exempt having applied above, in the top 20 of the Official Money List of the 2008 PGA Tour on completion of the Crowne Plaza Invitational at Colonial
Bart Bryant, Ryuji Imada

17. First 2 PGA Tour members and any PGA Tour members tying for 2nd place, not exempt, in a cumulative money list taken from The Players Championship and the five PGA Tour events leading up to and including the 2008 AT&T National
Rocco Mediate
(Eligible but not competing: Kenny Perry)

18. The leading player, not exempt having applied above, in the first 5 and ties of each of the 2008 AT&T National and the 2008 John Deere Classic
Freddie Jacobson, Jay Williamson

19. Playing members of the 2007 Presidents Cup teams
Lucas Glover, Nick O'Hern (David Toms withdrew prior to start of tournament)

20. First place on the 2007 Asian Tour Order of Merit
Liang Wenchong

21. First 2 on the Order of Merit of the PGA Tour of Australasia for 2007
Craig Parry, David Smail

22. First place on the Order of Merit of the Southern Africa Sunshine Tour for 2007 
James Kingston

23. The RBC Canadian Open Champion for 2007

24. The Japan Open Champion for 2007

25. First 2 on the Official Money List of the Japan Golf Tour for 2007
Brendan Jones, Hideto Tanihara

26. The leading 4 players, not exempt, in the 2008 Mizuno Open Yomiuri Classic
Michio Matsumura, Prayad Marksaeng, Yoshinobu Tsukada, Azuma Yano

27. First 2 and anyone tying for 2nd place, not exempt having applied (26) above, in a cumulative money list taken from all official Japan Golf Tour events from the 2008 Japan PGA Championship up to and including the 2008 Mizuno Open Yomiuri Classic
Hiroshi Iwata, Shintaro Kai

28. The Senior British Open Champion for 2007

29. The 2008 Amateur Champion
Reinier Saxton (a)

30. The U.S. Amateur Champion for 2007
(Colt Knost turned professional and forfeited his invitation.)

31. The European Individual Amateur Champion for 2007
Benjamin Hébert (a)

International Final Qualifying
Africa: Josh Cunliffe, Darren Fichardt, Doug McGuigan, Hennie Otto
Australasia: Peter Fowler, Brad Lamb, Ewan Porter, Andrew Tampion
Asia: Adam Blyth, Danny Chia, Lam Chih Bing, Angelo Que
America: Craig Barlow, Rich Beem, Alex Čejka, Tom Gillis, Paul Goydos, Matt Kuchar, Doug LaBelle II, Michael Letzig, Davis Love III, Scott McCarron, Jeff Overton, Tim Petrovic, John Rollins, Kevin Stadler
Europe: Thomas Aiken, Phillip Archer, Peter Baker, Grégory Bourdy, Ariel Cañete, Simon Dyson, Pelle Edberg, Johan Edfors, Ross Fisher, Jean-Baptiste Gonnet, David Horsey, José-Filipe Lima, Alex Norén, Simon Wakefield, Anthony Wall, Paul Waring, Steve Webster, Martin Wiegele

Local Final Qualifying  (Monday 7 July and Tuesday 8 July)
Hillside: Rohan Blizard (a), Jamie Elson, Jean van de Velde, Chris Wood (a)
Southport and Ainsdale: Jon Bevan, Gary Boyd, Jamie Howarth, Tom Sherreard (a)
West Lancashire: Peter Appleyard, Barry Hume, Jonathan Lomas, Philip Walton

Alternates
 Camilo Villegas - took spot not taken by Kenny Perry
 Pat Perez - replaced Luke Donald
 Jerry Kelly - replaced David Toms
 Heath Slocum - replaced Toru Taniguchi

Venue

Course layout

Source:
Lengths of the course for previous Opens:

 1998: , par 70
 1991: , par 70
 1983: , par 71  
 1976: , par 72

 1971: , par 73
 1965: , par 73
 1961: , par 72     
 1954:

Round summaries

First round
Thursday, 17 July 2008

Rocco Mediate, 2008 U.S. Open runner-up, shot a one-under par round of 69 to take the 18-hole lead alongside Graeme McDowell and Robert Allenby. One shot back at even-par was 53-year old two-time champion Greg Norman with fellow countryman Adam Scott.

Second round
Friday, 18 July 2008

The cut was at 149 (+9) and 83 advanced, including Ernie Els and Phil Mickelson, who played in the terrible morning conditions in the first round.

Amateurs: Wood (+5), Sherreard (+6), Hébert (+12), Blizard (+15), Saxton (+17).

Third round
Saturday, 19 July 2008

Greg Norman, age 53, became the oldest to hold at least a share of the 54-hole lead (it lasted just one year, as Tom Watson led after three rounds in 2009 at age 59). Due to extremely high winds, there were no under-par rounds, and it was first time since 1986 when the 54-hole leader was not under par.

Final round 
Sunday, 20 July 2008

Despite a wrist injury that almost forced him to withdraw prior to the tournament, Pádraig Harrington successfully defended his Open Championship title. Harrington pulled away from the field with a tremendous back nine and became only the fifth to repeat at the Open in the last fifty years. Runner-up Ian Poulter matched Harrington's 69 and was four strokes back, while Greg Norman faltered with eight bogeys for 77 and tied for third place with Henrik Stenson.

Source:
Amateurs: Wood (+10), Sherreard (+14).
(a) denotes amateur

Scorecard
Final round

Cumulative tournament scores, relative to par

Source:

References

External links
Royal Birkdale 2008 (Official site)
137th Open Championship- Royal Birkdale (European Tour)
2008 Open Championship (PGA of America)

The Open Championship
Golf tournaments in England
Open Championship
Open Championship
Open Championship